Stonebridge Green is a settlement adjacent to, and within the civil parish of, Egerton in the Ashford District of Kent, England. It lies immediately north east of the main village, and includes the bridge over the Great Stour river, after which it is named.

Borough of Ashford